Max Bell Centre may refer to:

Max Bell Centre (Calgary), Alberta, Canada
Max Bell Centre (Winnipeg), Manitoba, Canada